The BS postcode area, also known as the Bristol postcode area, is a group of 37 postcode districts in South West England, within eight post towns. These cover the city of Bristol, north Somerset (including Weston-super-Mare, Axbridge, Banwell, Cheddar, Clevedon, Wedmore and Winscombe) and south Gloucestershire.



Coverage
The approximate coverage of the postcode districts:

! style="background:#FFFFFF;"|BS0
| style="background:#FFFFFF;"|BRISTOL
| style="background:#FFFFFF;"|
| style="background:#FFFFFF;"|non-geographic
|-
! BS1
| BRISTOL
| Bristol city centre, Redcliffe
| Bristol
|-
! BS2
| BRISTOL
| Kingsdown, St Paul's, St Phillips, St Agnes
| Bristol
|-
! BS3
| BRISTOL
| Bedminster, Southville, Bower Ashton, part of Totterdown, Windmill Hill
| Bristol
|-
! BS4
| BRISTOL
| Brislington, Knowle, Knowle West, St Anne's, part of Totterdown
| Bristol
|-
! BS5
| BRISTOL
| Easton, St George, Redfield, Whitehall, Eastville, Speedwell, Greenbank, Barton Hill
| Bristol
|-
! BS6
| BRISTOL
| Cotham, Redland, Montpelier, Westbury Park, St. Andrew's
| Bristol
|-
! BS7
| BRISTOL
| Bishopston, Horfield, part of Filton, Lockleaze, Ashley Down 
| Bristol, South Gloucestershire
|-
! BS8
| BRISTOL
| Clifton, Failand, Hotwells, Leigh Woods
| Bristol, North Somerset
|-
! BS9
| BRISTOL
| Coombe Dingle, Sneyd Park, Stoke Bishop, Westbury on Trym, Henleaze
| Bristol 
|-
! BS10
| BRISTOL
| Brentry, Henbury, Southmead, part of  Westbury on Trym
| Bristol
|-
! BS11
| BRISTOL
| Avonmouth, Shirehampton, Lawrence Weston
| Bristol
|-
! BS13
| BRISTOL
| Bedminster Down, Bishopsworth, Hartcliffe, Withywood, Headley Park
| Bristol
|-
! BS14
| BRISTOL
| Hengrove, Stockwood, Whitchurch, 
| Bristol, Bath and North East Somerset
|-
! BS15
| BRISTOL
| Hanham, Kingswood
| Bristol, South Gloucestershire
|-
! BS16
| BRISTOL
| Downend, Emersons Green, Fishponds, Frenchay, Pucklechurch, Staple Hill 
| Bristol, South Gloucestershire
|-
! BS20
| BRISTOL
| Pill, Portishead
| North Somerset
|-
! BS21
| CLEVEDON
| Clevedon
| North Somerset
|-
! BS22
| WESTON-SUPER-MARE
| Kewstoke, Weston-super-Mare, Worle
| North Somerset
|-
! BS23
| WESTON-SUPER-MARE
| Uphill, Weston-super-Mare
| North Somerset
|-
! BS24
| WESTON-SUPER-MARE
| Bleadon, Hutton, Locking, Lympsham, Puxton, Weston-super-Mare, Wick St. Lawrence
| North Somerset, Sedgemoor
|-
! BS25
| WINSCOMBE
| Churchill, Winscombe, Sandford, Shipham
| North Somerset, Sedgemoor
|-
! BS26
| AXBRIDGE
| Axbridge, Compton Bishop, Loxton
| Sedgemoor, North Somerset
|-
! BS27
| CHEDDAR
| Cheddar, Draycott
| Sedgemoor, Mendip
|-
! BS28
| WEDMORE
| Wedmore
| Sedgemoor
|-
! BS29
| BANWELL
| Banwell
| North Somerset
|-
! BS30
| BRISTOL
| Bitton, Longwell Green, Cadbury Heath, Oldland Common, Warmley, Wick
| South Gloucestershire
|-
! BS31
| BRISTOL
| Keynsham, Saltford
| Bath and North East Somerset
|-
! BS32
| BRISTOL
| Almondsbury, Bradley Stoke
| South Gloucestershire
|-
! BS34
| BRISTOL
| Part of Filton, Little Stoke, Patchway, Stoke Gifford
| South Gloucestershire
|-
! BS35
| BRISTOL
| Alveston, Rudgeway, Severn Beach, Pilning, Thornbury
| South Gloucestershire
|-
! BS36
| BRISTOL
| Frampton Cotterell, Winterbourne
| South Gloucestershire
|-
! BS37
| BRISTOL
| Chipping Sodbury, Yate
| South Gloucestershire
|-
! BS39
| BRISTOL
| Paulton, Clutton, Temple Cloud, High Littleton, Pensford, Bishop Sutton
| Bath and North East Somerset
|-
! BS40
| BRISTOL
| Chew Valley, Chew Magna, Chew Stoke, Wrington, Charterhouse
| Bath and North East Somerset, North Somerset, Mendip
|-
! BS41
| BRISTOL
| Long Ashton, Dundry
| North Somerset
|-
! BS48
| BRISTOL
| Backwell, Nailsea
| North Somerset
|-
! BS49
| BRISTOL
| Congresbury, Yatton
| North Somerset
|-
! style="background:#FFFFFF;"|BS98
| style="background:#FFFFFF;"|BRISTOL
| style="background:#FFFFFF;"|
| style="background:#FFFFFF;"|non-geographic
|-
! style="background:#FFFFFF;"|BS99
| style="background:#FFFFFF;"|BRISTOL
| style="background:#FFFFFF;"|
| style="background:#FFFFFF;"|non-geographic
|}

Historic codes
Until about 1994 different numbers applied to districts from BS12 upwards.

No longer existing are: BS12, BS17, BS18 and BS19; these were as follows:

BS12 covered: Almondsbury, Alveston, Aust, Awkley, Bradley Stoke, Earthcote Green, Easter Compton, Elberton, Filton, Ingst, Itchington, Littleton-on-Severn, Morton, Northwick, Oldbury Naite, Oldbury-on-Severn, Olveston, Over, Patchway, Pilning, Redwick, 
Rudgeway, Severn Beach, Shepperdine, Stoke Gifford, Thornbury, and Tockington

BS17 covered: Chipping Sodbury, Mangotsfield, Old Sodbury, Pucklechurch, Rangeworthy, Winterbourne, and Yate

BS18 covered: Compton Dando, High Littleton, Saltford, Long Ashton, West Harptree, Wrington, Paulton, Chew Magna, Blagdon, Temple Cloud, and Keynsham.

BS19 covered: Backwell, Churchill, Congresbury, Flax Bourton, Nailsea and Yatton.

The above codes are correct, but not complete. Other towns and villages may have shared these postcodes.

Map

See also
List of postcode areas in the United Kingdom
Postcode Address File

References

External links
Royal Mail's Postcode Address File
A quick introduction to Royal Mail's Postcode Address File (PAF)

Postcode areas covering South West England